Mordella uniformis is a species of beetle in the genus Mordella of the family Mordellidae, which is part of the superfamily Tenebrionoidea. It was discovered in 1895. It is found in Australia.

References

Beetles described in 1895
uniformis